Cofactor may also refer to:
 Cofactor (biochemistry), a substance that needs to be present in addition to an enzyme for a certain reaction to be catalysed or being catalytically active.

 A domain parameter in elliptic curve cryptography, defined as the ratio between the order of a group and that of the subgroup
 Cofactor (linear algebra), the signed minor of a matrix
 Minor (linear algebra), an alternative name for the determinant of a smaller matrix than that which it describes
 Shannon cofactor, a term in Boole's (or Shannon's) expansion of a Boolean function

See also
 Factor (disambiguation)